Dzyanis Obrazaw (born 24 June 1988) is a Belarusian professional footballer who plays for Slutsk.

Honours
Naftan Novolopotsk
Belarusian Cup winner: 2011–12

External links

1988 births
Living people
Sportspeople from Vitebsk
Belarusian footballers
Association football forwards
Belarusian expatriate footballers
Expatriate footballers in Kazakhstan
FC Molodechno players
FC Polotsk players
FC Dnepr Mogilev players
FC Naftan Novopolotsk players
FC Slutsk players
FC Atyrau players